Abass Rassou (born 12 December 1986) is a Cameroonian born Rwanda footballer.

References

1986 births
Living people
Expatriate footballers in Hungary
Expatriate footballers in Morocco
Rwanda international footballers
Diósgyőri VTK players
APR F.C. players
Association football forwards
Cameroonian footballers
Cameroonian expatriate footballers